María Elena Santonja Esquivias (29 May 1932 – 17 October 2016) was a Spanish TV presenter and occasional actress.

Biography
She was the host of some shows in the early days of TVE such as Entre nosotras (1958), but she reached fame as a host of the cooking show Con las manos en la masa, that lasted from 1984 to 1991. In this program she cooked food alongside many celebrities (a different one per episode) such as Gonzalo Torrente Ballester, Rosa Chacel, Carlos Berlanga, Joaquín Sabina, Alaska...

She also made sporadic roles as actress in films such as El verdugo (1963) by Luis García Berlanga or Crimen de doble filo (1965) by José Luis Borau.

She married in 1956 with film director and scriptwriter Jaime de Armiñán whom she had 3 children: Álvaro, Eduardo and Carmen.

She died on 17 October 2016 in Madrid at aged 84.

Books 
 Paso a paso por la cocina de Elena (Redacted by Elena Santonja, Álvaro Lión-Depetre and Carmen Beamonte de Cominges) (1987). Cookbook
 24 setas de Madrid (Alongside Manuel Elexpuru) (1987)
 Diccionario de cocina (1997)
 Las recetas de mis amigos (1998). Cookbook

References

External links

1932 births
2016 deaths
Spanish television presenters
Spanish women television presenters
People from Madrid